Angoram/Middle Sepik Rural LLG is a local-level government (LLG) of East Sepik Province, Papua New Guinea.

Wards
01. Changriwa (Changriwa language speakers)
02. Marambao
03. Kanduanum
04. Krinjambi
05. Tambari
06. Agrumara
07. Yuarma
08. Mundomundo
09. Kambrindo
10. Moim
11. Pinang
12. Magendo 1
13. Magendo 2
15. Ex Service Camp
16. Angoram Village
17. Gavieng Resett 1
18. Gavieng Resett 2
19. Gavieng Resett 3
20. Gavieng Resett 4
21. Tambunum
22. Wombun
23. Timbunke
24. Angriman
25. Mindimbit
26. Kamanimbit
27. Kararau
28. Timboli
29. Indigum
30. Chikinumbu
31. Chimbian
32. Saui
33. Kingavi
34. Koiwat (Koiwat language speakers)
35. Paimbit
81. Angoram Urban

References

Local-level governments of East Sepik Province